Minas Osmani (born 22 February 1985) is a midfielder from North Macedonia of Albanian ethnicity. He currently plays for FK Drita.

Club career
Osmani has played at a number of Macedonian clubs that include the likes of FK Rabotnički, FK Vardar, FK Vlazrimi, FK Cementarnica 55 Skopje, FK Milano Kumanovo, FK Renova, GFK Tikvesh.

International career
Minas Osmani was ever present in Macedonian Youth National Teams where he was capped 33 times and scored a total of 7 goals.

External links
 Macedonian Football 
 

1985 births
Living people
Footballers from Skopje
Albanians in North Macedonia
Association football midfielders
Macedonian footballers
North Macedonia youth international footballers
FK Vardar players
FK Vëllazërimi 77 players
FK Renova players
FK Rabotnički players
FK Metalurg Skopje players
Besa Kavajë players
FK Tikvesh players
FK Olimpik players
NK Travnik players
FK Drita players
FK Shkupi players
KF Gostivari players
Macedonian First Football League players
Kategoria Superiore players
Premier League of Bosnia and Herzegovina players
Macedonian Second Football League players
Macedonian expatriate footballers
Expatriate footballers in Albania
Macedonian expatriate sportspeople in Albania
Expatriate footballers in Bosnia and Herzegovina
Macedonian expatriate sportspeople in Bosnia and Herzegovina
Expatriate footballers in Kosovo
Macedonian expatriate sportspeople in Kosovo